Gongalla Sanjeeva Reddy a politician and  artist from Indian National Congress party is an ex-Member of the Parliament of India who represented Andhra Pradesh in the Rajya Sabha, the upper house of the Indian Parliament.

Early life
Gongalla Sanjeeva Reddy was born in Hyderabad to Smt. Narasamma and Sri. Achi Reddy.

In recognition of his outstanding achievements in Public life and singular service to the nation, Dr. Reddy an epitome of national leader was conferred with Doctorate by Mahatma Gandhi Kashi Vidyapith, Varanasi (peacock terms).

Early career
Dr. Reddy joined the trade union movement as a young worker in 1948 and was elected General Secretary of INTUC Andhra Branch in 1950. He was soon elevated as its President in 1954 which position he continues till today. In addition, he is also the president of premier National Trade Unions in Electricity, Tunnel, Coal, Health, Medical, Engineering, Chemical, Municipal, Cement Workers, Steel Workers, Cigarette and Tobacco Workers. Dr. Reddy was first elected to coveted post of President, INTUC on 3 August 1994 from Shri G. Ramanujam when he was appointed Governor of Orissa in 1994 and since then he has been unanimously elected continuously. Dr. Reddy’s popularity in International forum is well known. He was elected Vice-President of International Confederation in March 1988 at Melbourne and he has since been re-elected continuously by the World Congress, the last one held at Copenhagen, Denmark in 2018. He has attended ILO Conference in Geneva many times.

Positions held
1962-1967 Member, Andhra Pradesh Legislative Assembly
1967-1972 Member, Andhra Pradesh Legislative Assembly
1968-1971 Cabinet Minister for Labour, Employment, Training and Rehabilitation, Government of Andhra Pradesh
April 2006 Elected to Rajya Sabha
June 2006-May 2009 and Aug. 2009 onwards Member, Parliamentary Committee on Industry
Sept. 2006 onwards Member, Parliamentary Committee on Papers Laid on the Table
Dec. 2006-May 2009 Member, National Board for Micro, Small and Medium Enterprises
Aug. 2007-May 2009 Member, Sub-Committee-III for Heavy Industries and Public Enterprises of the Parliamentary Committee on Industry
Aug. 2009-Aug. 2010 Member, Parliamentary Committee on Labour
Aug. 2009 onwards Member, Consultative Committee for the Ministry of Heavy Industries and Public Enterprises
September 2010 onwards Member, Parliamentary Committee on Industry
Aug. 1994 onwards President Indian National Trade Union Congress (INTUC)
September 2010 onwards director Indian Institute of Management(IIM) Rohtak
Jan. 2011 onwards Vice president, International Trade Union Confederation - Belgium
Feb. 2011-Nov. 2015 President International Trade Union Confederation - Asia Pacific Region - Singapore

He was the Chairman of AICC Labour Cell till it was abolished and INTUC was included in AICC's frontal organisations and he is special Invitee of Congress Working Committee. He was also the member of National Integration Council. In addition, he is associated as member on various committees and boards constituted by the Central Government. He has been the Chairperson of Regional Board for Workers Education, Hyderabad and member of 2nd National Commission on Labour. He has also been the Director A.P. Road Transport Corporation, Hindustan Salts Ltd., Union Bank of India, Hyderabad Allwyn Limited and Vice President of A.P. Productivity Council.

Representing India 
Dr Reddy represented India in Conferences, Summits, Forums, Meetings held at U.S., Russia, China, Nepal, Denmark, Philippines, United Kingdom, South Korea, Indonesia, France,  Belgium, Australia, Singapore, Switzerland, Italy, Japan, Hong Kong, Sri Lanka, Canada, etc. in connection with trade union issues.
He attended ILO Conferences in Geneva and Bangkok many times. He was a member of Indian Delegation for World Summit for Social Development at Copenhagen. He attended World Economic Forum held at New York City in 2002.

External links
 President of INTUC
 Congress Working Committee Member
 Vice President ITUC-CSI
 President of ITUC AP 

Indian National Congress politicians from Telangana
1930 births
Living people
Rajya Sabha members from Andhra Pradesh
Politicians from Hyderabad, India
Members of the Andhra Pradesh Legislative Assembly
Trade unionists from Andhra Pradesh
Governors of Odisha